The European Civil Service Training Network (or ENTO) is a network which groups together the local and regional training establishments and programmes for nearly all 47 Council of Europe member states.

Purpose 
While the idea for a European network such as this was first proposed by the Council of Europe, it became an independent association in 1995 and groups a wide variety of members together some with extensive experience and others which have been relatively recently created or organized. This diversity fosters a network with a wide range of abilities which facilitates the exchange of ideas and pools experience from various bodies in related fields.

Improving Public Administration 
One of the primary purposes behind ENTO lies in the strengthening of local democracy which is essential for democratic society. As a result of its work, fundamental reforms have been implemented in many European countries. These have created greater efficiency of officials and elected representatives at all levels of government starting at the local level. The reforms have also helped to support both the Council of Europe (more particularly the Congress of Local and Regional Authorities of the Council of Europe) and the European Union initiatives and efforts to improve public administration throughout Europe but particularly in Central and Eastern Europe. The training and availability of skilled staff ensures that duties and carried out professionally, lawfully, and democratically in each country.

Sources 
ENTO at the Congress of Local and Regional Authorities 
ENTO Website

Council of Europe
Congress of the Council of Europe